Blue cheese wontons are a New Zealand street food from Te Aro in Central Wellington, consisting of wontons stuffed with blue cheese, which are then deep fried and served with raspberry jam or coulis. Wontons are a popular food among Wellingtonians in general, owing to the city's sizeable Chinese community. Originating in the Cuba Precinct of Te Aro in the 1990s, they have become popular throughout other Wellington suburbs a cheap snack served in cafés and restaurants. The cheese used can vary but is often stilton or gorgonzola, and some recipes call for chunky peanut butter and coriander.

See also 
 Crab rangoon

References 

New Zealand Chinese cuisine
Dumplings
Deep fried foods